Pool D of the First Round of the 2013 World Baseball Classic was held at Chase Field, Phoenix and Salt River Fields at Talking Stick, Scottsdale, Arizona, United States from March 7 to 10, 2013.

Pool D was a round-robin tournament. Each team played the other three teams once, with the top two teams advancing to Pool 2.

Standings

Pool D MVP:  Michael Saunders

Results
All times are Mountain Standard Time (UTC−07:00).

Italy 6, Mexico 5

Italy 14, Canada 4

Mexico 5, United States 2

Canada 10, Mexico 3

Brawl
The Canada-Mexico game was marred by a bench-clearing brawl in the top of the ninth inning. Team Canada, who had a sizeable 9-3 lead at that point, began the frame with a Chris Robinson bunt single. Though bunting for a hit would customarily be against baseball etiquette with a large lead, the fact that run differential would be used in tie-breaking procedures made the play more of a strategic move. Still, Team Mexico took the play as a slight, with television cameras catching third baseman Luis Cruz motioning to pitcher Arnold Leon to bean the next Canadian batter, Rene Tosoni. Leon's first two pitches were thrown inside to Tosoni, neither of which made contact. Both benches were warned after the second pitch, but nonetheless, Leon threw at Tosoni a third time, finally hitting him. Tosoni then walked towards the mound, with both benches emptying to incite the brawl. After the fighting had died down, with both teams returning to their benches, Mexican fans from behind the Canadian dugout began to get involved, with a fan throwing a water bottle that hit Canadian pitching coach Denis Boucher in the head. Shortstop Cale Iorg responded by firing the bottle back into the stands. Seven players total were ejected, and no disciplinary measures such as suspensions were taken following the game.

United States 6, Italy 2

The United States went ahead of Italy in the fifth inning on a grand slam hit by third baseman David Wright and held on to win the game. Wright's home run was seen as a turning point of lackluster play by the US up until that point.

United States 9, Canada 4

Team USA and Canada went toe to toe until outfielder Adam Jones doubled home two runs in the eighth inning off of Canada's Jimmy Henderson.  Jones later scored on a single by Shane Victorino and the USA tacked on four more run in the ninth inning, punctuated by a three-run double by Eric Hosmer.  The United States went on to win the game 9-4, earning them the Pool D victory and a berth to the second round in Miami, as Canada was eliminated from the tournament for the third time.

References

External links
Official website

Pool D
World Baseball Classic Pool D
2010s in Phoenix, Arizona
Baseball competitions in Scottsdale, Arizona
International baseball competitions hosted by the United States
World Baseball Classic Pool D
Baseball competitions in Phoenix, Arizona